Friedelin synthase is an enzyme with systematic name (3S)-2,3-epoxy-2,3-dihydrosqualene mutase (cyclizing, friedelin-forming). This enzyme catalyses the following chemical reaction

 (3S)-2,3-epoxy-2,3-dihydrosqualene  friedelin

The enzyme from Kalanchoe daigremontiana also gives traces of other triterpenoids.

References

External links 
 

EC 5.4.99